The Ouled Naïl are an Arab tribe and a tribal confederation living in the Ouled Naïl Range, Algeria. They are found mainly in Bou Saâda, M'Sila and Djelfa, but there is also a significant number of them in Ghardaïa.

Origins
The oral lore of the Ouled Naïl people claims ancient Arab descent from tribes that arrived in the area about a thousand years ago. Some traditions trace their ancestry to the Banu Hilal of Hejaz, who came to the highlands through El Oued, Ghardaia, while others claim that they are direct descendants of Idris I.

Traditional lifestyle

The Ouled Naïl are seminomadic or nomadic people living in the highlands of the range of the Saharan Atlas to which they gave their name. The town of Djelfa has been traditionally an important market and trade centre for the Ouled Naïl, especially for their cattle. The town has cold and long winters with temperatures averaging 4 °C. In recent years Djelfa Province has become one of the most populated provinces of the Hauts-Plateaux with a population of 1,164,870.

The Ouled Naïl have traditionally reared cattle as nomads in their mountain grasslands, as well in the northern Hodna region and the Dayas in the south. When they are nomadic they live in black-and-red striped tents, but they also used to live in dechra, or non fortified villages, or in ksour, fortified ones. Cereal cultivation is possible in the mountain heights, although with rather irregular results. They rarely were able to cultivate date palms in the heights but obtained dates from other areas by trading, especially in Bou Saâda located at the feet of the northern end of the mountain range.

Despite the harsh conditions of the dry and cold highlands where they live, this ethnic group has managed to fare fairly well in their traditional environment along the centuries. However, the odd years of drought and years with prolonged, cold winters are disastrous for the Ouled Nail; in 1944, and again in 1947, when weather conditions were especially rough, about 50% of their livestock died and famines followed.

Dances and songs
The Ouled Naïl tribe originated a style of music, sometimes known as Bou Saâda music after the town near their homeland. In belly dancing, the term refers to a style of dance originated by the Ouled Naïl, noted for their way of dancing.

Although their primary roles and activities in their rural milieu were connected with animal farming, most women trained in the art of dance and song from childhood. Thus for Ouled Naïl females the practice of leaving their ancestral home and settling in a nearby desert town as entertainers was common. This was especially so in times of disaster and famine, when a woman had relative freedom to fend for herself in order to survive, save money and improve her future economic status.

"Exotic" representations

 
The 1956 edition of the Michelin Guide devotes only a few lines to the Ouled Naïl mountain region; Djelfa is not even mentioned and the Ouled Naïl people are "mere courtesans and Oriental dancers". 
French colonialist representations of the Ouled Naïl concentrated almost exclusively on women who temporarily left their home and settled in some nearby town. However, none of the highland tribes to which they belonged were specialised in prostitution and only some Ouled Naïl women became dancers. A British traveller, Lawrence Morgan, gave an account of his experiences living with the Ouled Naïl which focuses on the lives of the dancers.   Still, the exuberance of their ornaments and the exoticism of their costumes added to the general fascination.

Auguste Maure, an orientalist photographer that lived in Biskra was active from 1860 to 1907 and took many photographs of landscapes and cities of south Algeria (El Kantara, Sidi Okba, Chetma, Tilatou, Tolga, Touggourt). The female members of the Ouled Naïl tribe, wearing the traditional colorful costumes and covered by jewels, were often represented on Maure photographs which were appreciated by tourists.

In the 1930s, painter Juanita Guccione lived among the Ouled Naïl people, and she used the experience as inspiration for some of her work.

See also
 Bou Saâda
 Djelfa
 Auguste Maure
 Nasreddine Dinet
 The Finale of the orchestral Suite Beni Mora by Gustav Holst is titled In the Street of the Ouled Naïls.

References

External links

A Brief Encounter with the Historical Ouled Nail
Images of the Ouled Nail
Etienne Dinet and the Ouled Naïl
FAO country reports: Algeria

Atlas Mountains
Ethnic groups in Algeria
African people of Arab descent